"Liebster Gott, wann werd ich sterben" ("Dearest God, when will I die") is a Lutheran hymn which Caspar Neumann, an evangelical theologian from Breslau, wrote around 1690. The topic of the hymn, which has five stanzas of eight lines, is a reflection on death. An elaborate analysis of the hymn's content was published in 1749. A few text variants of the hymn originated in the 18th century. Neumann's text is usually sung to the hymn tune of "Freu dich sehr o meine Seele".

Daniel Vetter, a native of Breslau, set the hymn in the first half of the 1690s, and published this setting in a version for SATB singers in 1713. This setting was picked up by Johann Sebastian Bach, who based some of his compositions on it. His chorale cantata based on Neumann's hymn, Liebster Gott, wenn werd ich sterben, BWV 8, was first performed in Leipzig in 1724, Vetter's hymn tune, Zahn No. 6634, appearing in its outer movements.

The closing chorale of BWV 8 is a reworked version of Vetter's four-part setting. The appreciation of the similarity (or: difference) between this cantata movement, BWV 8/6, and Vetter's original ranges from "somewhat altered" to "with radical alterations", the 1998 edition of the Bach-Werke-Verzeichnis listing the 1724 version as a composition by Vetter. Another setting of Neumann's hymn was published in 1747.

Text

Neumann was born in Breslau (i.e. Wrocław, at the time in German Silesia) in 1648. From 1667 to 1670 he studied in Jena. Less than a year after having been assigned court preacher in Altenburg in 1678, he returned to his native town, where he became pastor at the St Mary Magdalene Church in 1689. He wrote "Liebster Gott, wann werd ich sterben" around 1690. It is a Lutheran hymn in five stanzas of eight lines. Its hymn metre is 8.7.8.7.7.7.8.8. The topic of the hymn text is a reflection on death. Gabriel Wimmer's extensive commentary on the hymn was published in 1749.

Content
In what follows, the German text of Neumann's hymn is according to Wimmer's publication, and the English translation of the hymn, where provided, is according to Charles Sanford Terry's 1917 publication on hymns as included in Bach's cantatas and motets: these verse translations are John Troutbeck's as published by Novello. The explanatory notes, comparing the hymn text to bible passages, are a translation of Wimmer's, based on KJV for bible quotes.
First stanza  

Second stanza  

Third stanza  

Fourth stanza  

Fifth stanza  

Another linking of phrases from the hymn, and paraphrases thereof, to biblical passages can be found in Melvin P. Unger's 1996 book with interlinear translations of Bach's cantata texts.

Adaptations
Copies of the 1720 and 1721 prints of Franz Anton von Sporck's Verschiedene Buß-Gedancken Einer Reumüthigen Seele, Uber Die Sterblichkeit deß Menschens are extant. The publication contains "O Gott! mein Zeit laufft immer hin", which is an adaptation of Neumann's hymn. Like the original, it has five stanzas of eight lines.

The text of the four middle movements of BWV 8 is an expanded paraphrase of stanzas two to four of Neumann's hymn. The second and third stanza of the hymn form the basis of the second and third movement of the cantata, which are an aria followed by a recitative. The text of the next two movements of the cantata, again an aria followed by a recitative, draws from, and expands upon, the hymn's fourth stanza.

In 1789,  published Hymnologie, oder, Ueber Tugenden und Fehler der verschiedenen Arten geistlicher Lieder, in which he presented an improved version of Neumann's hymn. Schmieder clarifies the improvements he proposes in accompanying prose. The incipit of this version reads: "Ach wie bald, Herr, kan ich sterben!".

Melodies and settings

Shortly after Neumann's death, in 1715, his collected prayers and hymns were published in Breslau, under the title Kern Aller Gebete und Gesänge. The publication mentions two possible pre-existing hymn tunes for "Liebster Gott, wann werd ich sterben":
 "Freu dich sehr o meine Seele"
 "Werde munter, mein Gemüte"
The second, Zahn No. 6551, was composed by Johann Schop and published in 1642. The first, Zahn No. 6543, EG 524, became the common melody for Neumann's hymn. This tune was originally published for a French (1551), and later a German (1587), version of Psalm 42 ("As the hart panteth after the water brooks"), before it was used for the "Freu dich sehr o meine Seele" hymn in the early 17th century, with which it was later generally associated. This melody is also known as GENEVAN 42, referring to its first publication, as "Wie nach einer Wasserquelle", referring to the German version of Psalm 42, and as "Abermal ein Jahr verflossen", referring to another hymn sung to the same tune. Bach adopted this melody with various texts (none of these, however, from Neumann's hymn) in his cantatas BWV 13, 19, 25, 30, 32, 39, 70 and 194. Hymnals which contain the text of Neumann's hymn and indicate the Zahn 6543 melody as its tune include:
 Das Privilegirte Ordentliche und Vermehrte Dreßdnische Gesang-Buch, No. 623 in editions of 1730, 1759 and 1768
 Sammlung von geist- und trostreichen Sterb- und Begräbniß-Liedern (1747), No. 62
 Neues vollständiges Gesang-Buch, für die Königlich-Preußische, auch Churfürstlich-Brandenburgische und andere Lande, No. 623 in editions of 1748 and 1757
 Neu-eingerichtetes Kirchen- und Haus- Gesang-Buch (1749), No. 1007
 Allgemeines und vollständiges Evangelisches Gesangbuch für die Königl. Preuß. Schles. Lande (1751), No. 1046
 Seelen erquickendes Harpffen-Spiel (1764), No. 571
 Pommerscher Sing- Bet- Lob- und Danck-Altar, oder vollständiges Gesang-Buch (1776), No. 763
 Liedersammlung zum Gebrauch für Kranke und Sterbende (1789), No. 58
 Ein Unpartheyisches Gesang-Buch, No. 366 in editions of 1804, 1808 and 1829
 Die Kleine Geistliche Harfe der Kinder Zions, No. 299 in editions of 1811 and 1834
 Erbauliche Lieder-Sammlung (1826), No. 581
 Die Gemeinschaftliche Liedersammlung, No. 185 in editions of 1841 and 1849
 Hamburgisches Gesangbuch (1842), No. 638

Vetter's setting
Vetter, a native of Breslau, published his four-part setting of Neumann's hymn in 1713, in the second volume of his Musicalische Kirch- und Hauß-Ergötzlichkeit. In the introduction of that publication he wrote:

By the time Vetter wrote this, he had been an organist in Leipzig for around 35 years. Carl von Winterfeld quoted Vetter's 1713 introduction on the history of the origin of his setting. Later in the 19th century, Philipp Spitta, Johannes Zahn and Max Seiffert retold Vetter's account of the origin of his setting, as did Charles Sanford Terry in the early 20th century.

Vetter's SATB setting, which has a figured bass, is in E-flat major. It is in bar form, with the stollen comprising two lines of text. Its character is rather that of a sacred aria than that of a (church) song or chorale. The soprano's melody of Vetter's setting is a hymn tune known as Zahn No. 6634:

This expressive melody is Pietist, as opposed to the hymn tunes customary in Orthodox Lutheranism. By the late 18th century, Vetter's setting of Neumann's hymn was hardly remembered.

Compositions based on Vetter's setting

There was a copy of the 1713 volume of Vetter's Musicalische Kirch- und Hauß-Ergötzlichkeit in the household of Johann Sebastian and Anna Magdalena Bach. Johann Sebastian composed the first version of his BWV 8 cantata in 1724. It is a cantata for the 16th Sunday after Trinity which is part of his second cantata cycle. Its first movement, setting the first stanza of the hymn, is a chorale fantasia on a modified form of Vetter's hymn tune. Its last movement, in E major like the first, is a reworked version of Vetter's four-part setting, for SATB choir, colla parte instruments and figured bass, with the last stanza of Neumann's hymn as text. By around 1735 the vocal parts of this movement, BWV 8/6, were adopted in the Dietel manuscript.

The Dietel manuscript also contains a four-part setting in E-flat major, BWV deest, of Vetter's hymn tune. In 1736, a voice and continuo arrangement of Vetter's hymn tune, attributed to Bach (BWV 483), in the same key, was included in Schemellis Gesangbuch. In 1747 Bach produced a second version of his BWV 8 cantata: its outer movements are D major transpositions of the same movements of the earlier version of the cantata.

When Bach's pupil Johann Friedrich Doles had become Thomaskantor some years after the composer's death, the BWV 8 cantata was performed again in Leipzig. According to the American musicologist , the widowed Anna Magdalena may have heard such performance, finding consolation in the hymn's text and setting. Friedrich Wilhelm Birnstiel published the four-part setting of the closing chorale of Bach's cantata in 1765. The same also appeared in the first volume of Breitkopf's edition of Bach's four-part chorales (1784), edited by Carl Philipp Emanuel Bach.

According to Winterfeld, Vetter's 1713 setting and the closing chorale of Bach's cantata are largely comparable: he sees it as an example of how Bach could, with a few adjustments, perfect an otherwise already agreeable composition. Winterfeld compared both settings in the Annex of his 1847 publication:

The Bach Gesellschaft published the E major version of Bach's chorale cantata in 1851, edited by Moritz Hauptmann. Spitta described the closing chorale of the cantata as a somewhat altered version of Vetter's setting. The BWV 483 setting was published in the Bach Gesellschaft Edition in 1893, edited by Franz Wüllner.  published the vocal score of the outer movements of the BWV 8 cantata in 1935, with his own piano reduction of the instrumental accompaniment. The New Bach Edition (NBE) contains four instances of the BWV 8/6 chorale:
 In E major, orchestrated, as part of the BWV 8.1 cantata, in Vol. I/23 (1982; editor: Helmuth Osthoff).
 In the same volume, the D major version, orchestrated, as part of the BWV 8.2 cantata.
 The E major version of the Dietel manuscript, containing only the vocal parts, in Vol. III/2.1 (1991; edited by ).
 The same variant, as included in  Bach's 18th-century edition of his father's chorales (Breitkopf edition), in Vol. III/2.2 (1996, also edited by Rempp).
Vol. I/23 of the NBE also contains both the E and D major versions of Bach's chorale fantasia on Vetter's "Liebster Gott, wann werd ich sterben" with which the BWV 8 cantata opens. The III/2.1 volume of the NBE includes the E-flat major chorale from the Dietel manuscript (in the publication indicated as BWV 8/6*), and the BWV 483 setting. In 2005, Richard D. P. Jones translated Dürr as writing, in his 1992 book on Bach's cantatas, that BWV 8/6 was "borrowed from Daniel Vetter, albeit with radical alterations." According to the same authors, Vetter's melody "had been commissioned for the burial of the Cantor Jakob Wilisius, and was no doubt especially well known in Leipzig."

Setting in Reimann's collection (1747)
 published his  (Collection of old and new melodies of Evangelical songs) in 1747. As No. 268 it contains a setting for Neumann's "Liebster Gott, wann werd ich sterben". Reimann was the first to publish this sacred song, but it is not his composition. Its tune, Zahn No. 6635, reappeared in an 18th-century manuscript and a 19th-century print.

Notes

References

Sources
 
 
 
 
 
 
 
 
 
 
 
 
 
 
 
 
 
   – facsimiles: szMJMq_zmygC at Google Books; 1077430 Liturg. 1372 o at Bavarian State Library; Musicalisches Gesang-Buch (Schemelli, Georg Christian) at IMSLP website.

External links
 BWV 8.6 (=BWV 8/6) at Luke Dahn's  (2019)
 
 Caspar Neumann’s Meditation on Death at Red Brick Parsonage website (contains a metrical translation of all stanzas of the hymn).

Lutheran hymns